The 1964 Singapore Open, also known as the 1964 Singapore Open Badminton Championships, took place from 28 February – 1 March 1964 at the Singapore Badminton Hall in Singapore.

Venue
Singapore Badminton Hall

Final results

References 

Singapore Open (badminton)
1964 in badminton